"My Friends" is a single released by Stereophonics from the album Pull the Pin. It was released on 10 December 2007, reaching #32 in the UK Singles Chart, making it the lowest charting single by the band since "More Life in a Tramps Vest" reached #33 back in 1997.

"Gimme Shelter" is a cover version of the Rolling Stones song.

The video shows the band playing the song at a gig, including clips of the crowd wearing masks making them look like ghosts. The crowd was made up of fans who replied to an email from the band asking for extras. The first 100 replies were called and invited to attend. The location was kept a secret until the morning of the shoot. It was filmed in the underground carpark at Earls Court.

Track listing

CD
"My Friends"
"Nitedrive"
"Gimme Shelter" (live from Tower Bridge rehearsals)(Jagger/Richards)
"My Friends" (live)

7" collectors vinyl
Side A 
"My Friends"

Side B

"Nitedrive"

Ltd USB Stick
"My Friends"
"Katman" (Live From Tower Bridge Rehearsals)
"My Friends" (video)
Fan photo video (fans have submitted pictures of themselves with the band or at a gig that has been made into a video)
Band Gallery
Wallpapers
Making of the Video

References

2007 singles
Stereophonics songs
Songs written by Kelly Jones
V2 Records singles
2007 songs